Hureiz is a Palestinian village located seven kilometers south-east of Hebron. The village is in the Hebron Governorate Southern West Bank. According to the Palestinian Central Bureau of Statistics, the village had a population of 997 in mid-year 2006. The primary health care facilities for the village are at Zif designated by the Ministry of Health as level 1 and at Yatta, level 3.

Footnotes

External links
Hureiz aerial photo,  Applied Research Institute - Jerusalem (ARIJ) 

Villages in the West Bank
Hebron Governorate
Municipalities of the State of Palestine